Kollovoz (from Slavic kolovoz) is a village in the former Shishtavec municipality in Kukës County, Albania. At the 2015 local government reform it became part of the municipality Kukës.

It is located along the Luma river, on the west side of Kollovoz mountain. The nearby villages are Topojan, Shtrezë, Novosej, Oreshkë and Nimcë.

Notable people
Havzi Nela

References

Populated places in Kukës
Villages in Kukës County